Frolovo is a town in Volgograd Oblast, Russia, located on the Archeda River (Don's basin),  north of Volgograd, the administrative center of the oblast. Population:

History
Frolovo grew out of the Cossack settlement of Frolov. The first written mention of the Frolov settlement was in 1859. At that time there were 22 yards in the settlement, 236 people lived there.

In 1868, construction the Gryazi–Povorino–Tsaritsyn railroad began, which passed near the settlement. In 1870, the Archeda railway station was founded, and the locomotive depot was opened.

It was granted town status in 1936.

Administrative and municipal status
Within the framework of administrative divisions, Frolovo serves as the administrative center of Frolovsky District, even though it is not a part of it. As an administrative division, it is incorporated separately as the town of oblast significance of Frolovo—an administrative unit with the status equal to that of the districts. As a municipal division, the town of oblast significance of Frolovo is incorporated as Frolovo Urban Okrug.

Climate

References

Notes

Sources

External links

Official website of Frolovo 
Frolovo Business Directory 

Cities and towns in Volgograd Oblast